The 1997 Eastern Illinois Panthers represented Eastern Illinois University as a member of the Ohio Valley Conference (OVC) during the 1997 NCAA Division I-AA football season.

Schedule

References 

Eastern Illinois
Eastern Illinois Panthers football seasons
Eastern Illinois Panthers football